Tony Wisniewski (born April 19, 1951) is an American politician and manufacturing engineer serving as a Republican member of Idaho House of Representatives the 5B district.

Early life and education 
Wisniewski was born in Los Angeles, California. In 1973, he earned a Bachelor of Science degree in mechanical engineering from Utah State University.

Career 
In 1988, Wisniewski became a principal manufacturing engineer for Digital Equipment Corporation, until 1996.

In 1996, Wisniewski became a senior manufacturing engineer with Esterline Advanced Input Systems,. In 2000, Wisniewski became a senior manufacturing engineer for Telect. In 2001, Wisniewski became a manufacturing engineer for Hotstart Incorporated, until 2017.

In November 2018, Wisniewski won the election and became a Republican member of Idaho House of Representatives for the 3B district. Wisniewski defeated Dan Hanks with 70.8% of the votes.

Personal life 
Wisniewski's wife is Melody Wisniewski. They have five children. Wisniewski and his family live in Post Falls, Idaho.

References

External links 
 Tony Wisniewski at ballotpedia.org

Living people
Republican Party members of the Idaho House of Representatives
Utah State University alumni
21st-century American politicians
1951 births